Paweł Jan Działyński (1594–1643) was a voivode of Pomorze from 1630 to 1643. He succeeded Samuel Konarski, and was himself followed by Gerhard Dönhoff, a member of the Dönhoff family.

Biography 
Działyński was the son of Mikołaj Działyński and Katarzyna Dulska. He married Jadwiga Czarnkowska, with whom he had daughters Katarzyna and Jadwiga and sons Adam, Jan, and Kazimierz.

He became the starosta of Bratiańsk in 1613 with the permission of King of Poland. Between 1604 and 1613 he was the delegate of regional szlachta of Chełm to the Polish Sejm. From 1630 on he was the under treasury of Prussia. He was nominated as the voivode of Pomorze on 16 May 1630.

Between 1637 and 1638 he mediated the conflict between Gdańsk and king Władysław IV Vasa over the share of tariffs taken at the port that was reserved for the Polish–Lithuanian Commonwealth.

He was known for his fervent opposition to the Protestant Reformation and as a result he founded an order of Franciscan friars in Prussia.

He died on 17 July 1649 in Bratian and was buried in Nowe Miasto Lubawskie in the basilica crypt.

1594 births
1643 deaths
Polish nobility
People from Royal Prussia
Prussian nobility
Paweł Jan